Maria Gerboth (born 19 June 2002) is a German nordic combined skier and former ski jumper.

She participated at the individual event at the FIS Nordic World Ski Championships 2021.

Nordic combined results

World Championships

References

External links

Living people
2002 births
German female ski jumpers
German female Nordic combined skiers
21st-century German women